Tom Costello (born 1866 – unknown) was an American jockey in the sport of Thoroughbred horse racing who won three American Classic Races.

Biography
As a young boy, Costello lived at the New York House of Refuge, a place for juveniles convicted of crimes or adjudicated as vagrants. He was one of a number of small boys given a place to live and work at the  Long Island Thoroughbred racehorse farm of George L. Lorillard. There, Costello was given an education in a classroom built at the stables by Lorillard, who encouraged their studies and gave prizes to leading students.

Along with the other boys, Tom Costello helped maintain the stables and learned to ride horses. After a five-year apprenticeship, they were given a chance to become professional jockeys. Costello was highly successful and became wealthy from riding. According to an 1881 newspaper report, by age fifteen he was worth $30,000.

Tom Costello rode Lorillard's Saunterer to a win in the 1881 Preakness and Belmont Stakes and in 1882 captured his second Preakness Stakes on Lorillard's colt, Vanguard. In 1881 Tom Costello also rode Memento to victory in the inaugural running of the Spinaway Stakes at Saratoga Race Course; at Monmouth Park Racetrack in New Jersey, he won back-to-back editions of the Long Branch Handicap aboard Monitor.

See also
George L. Lorillard
Long Branch Stakes

References

External links
 22 December 1881 Newspaper clipping on George Lorillard and his stable jockeys
 June 8, 1881 New York Times article on Tom Costello's win in the Belmont Stakes

1866 births
American jockeys
Year of death missing